William "Wild Bill" Hortie (January 4, 1931 – November 8, 2012) was a Canadian football player who played for the BC Lions and Edmonton Eskimos. He previously played football at the University of British Columbia.

References

1931 births
2012 deaths
Canadian football running backs
UBC Thunderbirds football players
BC Lions players
Edmonton Elks players
Players of Canadian football from Alberta
People from Grande Prairie